Bamofin Abimbola Ogunbanjo was the Group Chairman of Nigerian Exchange Group Plc, (NGX Group), the non-operating holding company the emerged from the demutualisation of The Nigerian Stock Exchange (NSE) from 2021 to 2022. Prior to this, he was the President of the National Council of the NSE from 2017 to 2021. He currently serves as  Managing Partner of  the renowned, leading corporate law firm of Chris Ogunbanjo LP  (Solicitors), a firm he joined in 1990 after a spell as a credit analyst with Chase Manhattan Bank (Nigeria) Limited. He serves on the boards of several multinational corporations and non-profit organizations including Beta Glass Plc and the Advisory Board of the University of Buckingham Centre for Extractive Studies. He previously served on the Board of GTL Registrars Limited, AIICO Insurance Plc and ConocoPhillips Limited amongst others.

Bamofin Ogunbanjo is a member of the International Bar Association, Nigerian Bar Association, Institute of Petroleum and a registered capital market consultant with the Securities and Exchange Commission, Nigeria.

Birth and education
Bamofin Abimbola Ogunbanjo was born in Nigeria to the family of Chris and Hilda Ogunbanjo, OFR, CON, a distinguished and foremost 
corporate lawyer, industrialist and philanthropist.
He had his early education at Corona School Apapa, University of Lagos Staff School, Claremont School, Hastings, Sussex and Igbobi College, Lagos before proceeding to Millfield School, Street, Somerset, England where he attained his GCE “O” Levels.
Bamofin Ogunbanjo holds a B.Sc. ( Hons) in Business Administration from the American College, Switzerland. He also holds LL.B. from University of Buckingham, United Kingdom. He has Certificates in International Capital Markets and Maritime Law from the New York Institute of Finance and the University of Southampton respectively. He provides pro-bono legal services to the Nigerian Chamber of Shipping and the Chris Ogunbanjo Foundation where he also serves on its board of directors.

He serves as Global Ambassador for the Cervical Cancer-Free Nigeria (CCFN) campaign, an initiative of the Global Oncology (GO), a US-based nonprofit organization supported by Standford University. The CCFN campaign aims to reduce the unnecessary deaths of Nigerian women form cervical cancer by raising awareness about the safety, efficacy, and availability of the human papillomavirus (HPV) vaccine among the Nigerian public

National and Traditional Awards
The Elerunwon of Erunwon-Ijebu in Council headed by his Royal Highness, Alaiyeluwa Oba Johnson Adebayo Adebola Okubena, on 8th December 2018 conferred on Ogunbanjo the traditional title of Bamofin of Erunwon Ijebu Kingdom, meaning the “father of lawyers”. 

On 11th October 2022, the President of the Federal Republic of Nigeria, His Excellency, Muhammadu Buhari, GCFR conferred the National Honour of Officer of the Order of the Federal Republic (OFR), on Bamofin Ogunbanjo for his sterling contributions to the development of the Capital Markets, Corporate law and in recognition of his outstanding virtues and in appreciation of his services to Nigeria.

References

Year of birth missing (living people)
Living people
Nigerian Stock Exchange
Alumni of the University of Buckingham
Place of birth missing (living people)
People educated at Millfield